Five-time defending champion David Wagner defeated Andrew Lapthorne in the final, 6–1, 6–2 to win the quad wheelchair tennis title at the 2017 Wheelchair Tennis Masters. It was his tenth Masters singles title.

Seeds

  David Wagner (champion)
  Andrew Lapthorne (final)
  Lucas Sithole (semifinals, third place)
  Heath Davidson (semifinals, fourth place)
  Antony Cotterill (round robin)
  Ymanitu Silva (round robin)

Draw

Finals

Group A

Group B

References

External links

Quad singles draw

Masters, 2017